Whirlwind is a 1988 Soviet action film directed by Bako Sadykov. It was screened in the Un Certain Regard section at the 1989 Cannes Film Festival.

Cast
 Vladimir Msryan
 Dumitru Fusu
 Mukhamadali Makhmadov
 Makhmud Takhiri
 Isfandiyor Gulyamov (as I. Gulyamov)
 Alfiya Nisambayeva
 Rustam Nugmagambetov
 Bobosaid Yatimov
 Dilorom Kambarova
 Rano Kubayeva
 Pyotr Krasichkov
 German Nurkhanov
 Dinmukhamet Akhimov

References

External links

1988 films
1980s Russian-language films
1988 action films
Soviet action films